Shahul Hameed (Tamil: சாகுல் ஹமீது; 1953-1998) was an Indian playback singer who sang predominantly in Tamil cinema under the music direction of the Academy winner A. R. Rahman. His association with the composer dates back to the TV jingles in the 1980s. He is most known for songs, Rasaathi En Usuru from Thiruda Thiruda (1993), Senthamizh Naatu Thamizhachiye from Vandicholai Chinraasu (1994), Urvasi Urvasi from Kadhalan (1994), Vaarayo Thozhi from Jeans (1998).

Early life and career
Shahul used to be a regular TV show singer in the 1980s. He has sung more than 30 songs in Isaithendral and other shows. He was highly noticed on the television in the year 1982. During this time, he met A. R. Rahman who was also popular in composing TV jingles. Their first association was for the album Deen Isai Mazhai, an Islamic Devotional album in 1989. There were some songs from this combination in the early 1990s and they became close friends.

Death
Shahul died in a car crash in 1998, near Chennai.

Discography

Tamil

References

External links
 

1953 births
1998 deaths
Tamil playback singers
20th-century Indian singers
Singers from Chennai
Indian male playback singers
Road incident deaths in India
20th-century Indian male singers